Patonia is a genus of shrimps belonging to the family Palaemonidae.

The species of this genus are found in Taiwan.

Species:
 Patonia mclaughlinae Mitsuhashi & Chan, 2006

References

Palaemonidae